Eisenhammer Dorfchemnitz is an historic hammer mill in Dorfchemnitz in the Ore Mountains of Germany. 
The mill is an important witness to proto-industrial development in the Ore Mountains. Of the once-numerous hammer mills only three others remain working in Saxony apart from the Frohnauer Hammer: the Frohnauer Hammer Mill, the Grünthal Copper Hammer Mill and the Freibergsdorf Hammer Mill.

The mill, which is situated on the Chemnitzbach stream, has been a technology museum since 1969 which, in addition to the actual hammer mill, also has a local history room.

Sources 
 Franz Eisel: Sachsens Museen & Schauanlagen des Berg- und Hüttenwesens. Husum Druck- und Verlagsgesellschaft, Husum 2007, 
 Benno Reichel: Die Entwicklung des Hammerwerkes Dorfchemnitz im Kreis Brand-Erbisdorf. in: Sächsische Heimatblätter, Heft 6/1958, S. 354–362
 Wolfgang Schmidt, Wilfried Theile: Denkmale der Produktions- und Verkehrsgeschichte. Teil 1. VEB Verlag für Bauwesen, Berlin 1989, 
 Rudolf Schumann: Der Eisenhammer zu Dorfchemnitz und die Ölmühle zu Friedebach. Zwei alte Arbeitsstätten im östlichen Erzgebirge. in: Mitteilungen des Landesvereins Sächsischer Heimatschutz, Bd. XXIX, Heft 1-4/1940, Dresden 1940, S. 43–53

References

External links 

 Informationen zum Eisenhammer Dorfchemnitz

Museums in the Ore Mountains
Museums in Saxony
Dorfchemnitz
Museums established in 1969
Technology museums in Germany